Marquis de Sade: Justine is a 1969 film directed by Jesús Franco. The film is based on the 1791 novel Justine by the Marquis de Sade. The film is set in 1700s France where Justine (Romina Power) and her sister Juliette (Maria Rohm) are orphans in Paris. Juliette becomes a prostitute and marries a rich noble. Justine is falsely arrested and sentenced to death, then escapes from prison to become a fugitive.

The film had Franco's largest budget to date, of just under a million dollars. Franco originally wanted to cast Rosemary Dexter as Justine, but was forced to cast Romina Power in the role, which led to Franco changing the story to suit her.

Plot
Justine lives with her sister Juliette in a convent. When they learn of their father's death, they are ordered out of the convent with their father's remaining gold. Juliette takes Justine to a friend, Madame de Buission, a brothel owner who requires the girls to work as prostitutes in return for accommodation. Justine refuses and leaves the brothel with her gold while Juliette stays. Juliette and a fellow prostitute named Claudine kill Madame de Buisson and one of her clients, stealing her gold and making their escape.

A man named Du Harpin agrees to let Justine stay for free if she serves as his maid. Du Harpin's master forces himself on Justine. She escapes but is instructed by Du Harpin to steal the man's gold amulet. Justine refuses.  While she is asleep, Du Harpin places the amulet in Justine's belongings to frame her, out of spite for her having refused to steal it for him. The next day, police find the amulet in Justine's belongings. Justine is taken to prison where she meets Madame Dubois, a virago sentenced for execution. Madame Dubois, impressed by Justine's innocent looks, includes her in an escape plan. The next day, Madame Dubois and Justine escape the prison safely.

While hiding out in a forest, Madame Dubois accepts Justine as part of her group. The male members of the group attempt to rape Justine. She escapes and faints near the house of a painter named Raymond, who makes her his model. They fall in love and live happily until the police arrive at Raymond's home, searching for Justine, and she must escape again.

Justine becomes a personal attendant to the Marquise de Bressac, whose husband asks Justine to kill his wife or be framed for a crime. The Marquise attempts to poison her husband, but he tricks her into drinking his wine, killing her. To punish Justine, the Marquis brands the letter 'M' for 'Murderess' on Justine's breast.

Justine arrives at a chateau where four ascetics are living a life of meditation and study. Justine asks for sanctuary there and is accepted by the Order. She learns, however, that the four men are sexual deviants whose four other female servants are, in fact, sex slaves. Justine ends up chained and tortured in the dungeon. Father Antonin suggests that Justine's sense of pleasure is enduring her suffering, to which Justine agrees. Pleased at having learnt their philosophy so swiftly, Antonin plans to "release" her by killing her in torture during a ritual. The ceremony goes awry and Justine escapes in the commotion.

Raymond finds Justine unconscious on the road and takes her to a nearby city. Madame Dubois spies Justine and takes her away to work as a nude show performer. During the show, Justine's brand causes an uproar in the venue. As she is being taken away by the police, she is spotted by Juliette, now a mistress of a Minister of the King. Juliette describes her wicked life as empty and says that Justine will earn her reward for a virtuous life despite her sufferings.

Juliette takes Justine away to live with her in her palace and finally, Justine and Raymond are seen walking away peacefully.

Cast

 Klaus Kinski as the Marquis de Sade
 Romina Power as Justine
 Maria Rohm as Juliette
 Harald Leipnitz as Raymond
 Jack Palance as Father Antonin
 Rosemary Dexter as Claudine
 Akim Tamiroff as du Harpin
 Horst Frank as Marquis de Bressac
 Sylva Koscina as Marquise de Bressac
 Mercedes McCambridge as Madame Dubois
 Carmen de Lirio as Madame de Buisson
 José Manuel Martín as Victor
 Rosalba Neri as Florette
 Claudia Gravy as Olivia

Production
After working on the film The Blood of Fu Manchu, producer Harry Alan Towers and director Jesús Franco wanted to make a film more aimed at an adult audience. Following Franco's desire to make an erotic film, Towers began writing a script based on Justine ou les malheurs de la vertu. The film had a budget that was less than one million dollars but was still Franco's highest budget film at the time.

Rosemary Dexter was originally intended to portray Justine, but only appears briefly in the role of Claudine. Romina Power's role in the film was forced on Franco by a Hollywood financer, which angered Franco as he felt that Power lacked the acting experience and sensuality that the role required. Franco altered the story to fit her, which diluted the essence of de Sade's original story.

Release
Marquis de Sade: Justine was released in Italy on 3 April 1969 and in West Germany on 13 June 1969. The film was heavily censored on its release with running times ranging from 120, 105, 93 and 90 minutes.

The film was released on DVD by Blue Underground on 27 January 2004. The DVD includes an interview with Jess Franco and Harry Alan Towers. It was released on a Region 2 DVD on 27 January 2003 by Anchor Bay Entertainment.

Reception

Robert Firsching for Allmovie gave the film two stars, referring to it as an "uneven adaptation of the Marquis de Sade's notorious Justine".

See also
 Cruel Passion, another film adaptation of the same novel
 Klaus Kinski filmography
 Marquis de Sade in popular culture
 List of German films of the 1960s
 List of Italian films of 1969

Notes

References
 Shipka, Danny. Perverse Titillation: The Exploitation Cinema of Italy, Spain and France, 1960–1980. McFarland, 2011. .

External links
 

1969 films
West German films
Italian historical drama films
Films based on works by the Marquis de Sade
Films about the Marquis de Sade
Films directed by Jesús Franco
Films scored by Bruno Nicolai
Films set in the 18th century
Films set in France
Films based on French novels
BDSM in films
1960s Italian films